Cleitagora or Clitagora or Kleitagora was a lyric poetess mentioned by Aristophanes in his Wasps and his lost play the Danaïdes; a fragment of Cratinus also mentions her.  A drinking song named "Cleitagora" is mentioned in Aristophanes' Lysistrata. 

According to a scholiast on Lysistrata and the Suda she was a Spartan.  However, the scholiast on the Wasps says that Cleitagora was Thessalian, and Hesychius says that she was from Lesbos.  Sarah Pomeroy argues that a Spartan origin is more likely.  As Spartan women, unlike other Greek women, drank wine in their daily life rather than only at religious festivals, it makes sense to name a drinking song after a Spartan woman.  If Cleitagora was Spartan, this would explain why the song "Cleitagora" was said to be more appropriate to sing than "Telamon" when the Spartan women are visiting in Lysistrata.  

Nothing further is known of either Cleitagora or the song named after her.

See also
 Megalostrata

References

Works cited
 
 
 

Ancient Greek lyric poets
Ancient Spartan poets
Ancient Spartan women
Ancient Greek women poets
5th-century BC poets
5th-century BC Greek women